The 1989 Kerry Senior Football Championship was the 89th staging of the Kerry Senior Football Championship since its establishment by the Kerry County Board in 1889. The championship ran from 24 June to 24 September 1989. It was the first championship to be sponsored after Allied Irish Bank took over the role.

Kenmare entered the championship as the defending champions, however, they were beaten by Laune Rangers in the quarter-finals.

The final was played on 24 September 1989 at FitzGerald Stadium in Killarney, between Laune Rangers and John Mitchels, in what was their first ever meeting in the final. Laune Rangers won the match by 2-13 to 1-06 to claim their seventh championship title overall and a first title in 78 years. They also became the first holders of the newly-commissioned Bishop Moynihan Cup.

Martin Dennehy was the championship's top scorer with 0-22.

Results

Preliminary round

First round

Quarter-finals

Semi-finals

Final

Championship statistics

Top scorers

Overall

In a single game

Miscellaneous
 Laune Rangers won the title for the first time in 78 years.
 Laune Rangers qualified for the final for the first time since 1911.
 John Mitchels qualified for the final for the first time since 1966.
 Laune Rangers were the first winners of the newly-commissioned Bishop Moynihan Cup.
 Laune Rangers 78-year gap between titles remains the longest gap between successive championship titles.

References

Kerry Senior Football Championship
1989 in Gaelic football